The S14 was a commuter rail route forming part of the Milan suburban railway service, serving the city of Milan, Italy, and surrounding areas.

The route ran over the infrastructure of the Milan Passante and Porto Ceresio–Milan. Like all but one of the other Milan suburban railway service routes, it was operated by Trenord.

Route 

  Milano Rogoredo ↔ Rho

Line S14, a cross-city route, heads initially in a southeasterly direction to Milan.  The line runs through the municipality of Milan, via the Milan Passante railway, to Milano Rogoredo, final destination.

History
The route was activated on 26 April 2015 for Expo 2015. It closed down in November 2015, but will be restored in the future when the western extension to Magenta opens.

Stations 
The stations on the S14 are as follows (the stations with a coloured background are within the municipality of Milan):

Scheduling 
, S14 trains ran hourly between 08:49 and 00:02 Monday to Saturday.

See also 

 History of rail transport in Italy
 List of Milan suburban railway stations
 Rail transport in Italy
 Transport in Milan

References

External links
 ATM – official site 
 Trenord – official site 
 Schematic of Line S14 – schematic depicting all stations on Line S14

Milan S Lines